The Kolyma Gulf (Yakut: Халыма хомото, Xalıma xomoto; Russian: Колымский залив, Kolymskiy Zaliv) is the largest gulf of the East Siberian Sea.

Geography
The gulf is more than 300 km wide. Its limits are the NE projection of the Kolyma Lowlands close to the Medvyezhi Islands in the west and the Nutel'gyrgym Peninsula and Ayon Island in the east.

The Kolyma River flows into the sea in the western side of the Kolyma Gulf, forming a huge river delta full of islands. The bay's coastline is lowland dotted with numerous lakes and swamps. The sea in this bay is frozen for over nine months every year and is often clogged with ice floes. Other rivers flowing into the Kolyma Gulf are the Rauchua and the Chukochya River.

Administratively the western section of the Kolyma Gulf belongs to the Sakha Republic (Yakutia), while its eastern section belongs to the Chukotka Autonomous Okrug of the Russian Federation.

References

External links
Location
 Wetlands in Russia
Arctic Coastal Dynamics

Gulfs of the East Siberian Sea
Gulfs of Russia
Bodies of water of the Sakha Republic
Bodies of water of Chukotka Autonomous Okrug